Miloš Šaka (Serbian Cyrillic: Милош Шака; born 12 April 1994) is a Serbian footballer who plays as a midfielder for Slovenian club NK Aluminij.

Club career
After playing in the youth categories of Partizan, Šaka made his senior debut with Teleoptik. In the summer of 2013, he moved to Bežanija. After two seasons at Bežanija, Šaka left the club in the summer of 2015.

In September 2020, Šaka joined FK Jedinstvo Ub.

International career
In October 2009, Šaka made his Serbia under-17 debut in the qualification round for the 2010 UEFA European Championship. In May 2011, he was part of the same team at the 2011 UEFA European Championship, which the country hosted, but didn't make any appearance due to ankle injury.

References

External links
 

1994 births
Living people
Serbian footballers
Serbian expatriate footballers
Serbia youth international footballers
Footballers from Belgrade
Association football midfielders
Serbian First League players
Serbian SuperLiga players
FK Partizan players
FK Teleoptik players
FK Bežanija players
FK Rad players
NK Aluminij players
FK Jedinstvo Ub players
Serbian expatriate sportspeople in Slovenia
Expatriate footballers in Slovenia